Viliamu "Willie" Talau (born 25 January 1976) is a former professional rugby league footballer who played in the 1990s and 2000s. A Samoa and New Zealand international representative , he played in the National Rugby League (NRL) for the Canterbury-Bankstown Bulldogs, and in the Super League for St Helens, with whom he won the 2006 Super League Grand Final and the Challenge Cup on four occasions, and for the Salford City Reds.

Background
Talau was born in Apia, Samoa.

Club career

Early years
Talau attended Spotswood College. Talau played for the Taranaki Rockets in the Lion Red Cup. At 21, his father gave him a one-way ticket to Australia to try his luck playing league. While playing in the metropolitan Cup he was spotted by Canterbury, who signed him to play in the National Rugby League. In the 1994 Lion Red Cup Talau played in nine matches, scoring one try. He then played in all 22 matches for the Rockets in the 1995 season.

Canterbury-Bankstown Bulldogs
Talau made his debut for Canterbury in round 17 of the 1998 NRL season against South Sydney. Talau scored a try in Canterbury's famous 1998 preliminary final victory over arch-rivals Parramatta. Canterbury were down 18-2 with less than ten minutes of the match remaining but won the game in extra-time 32-20.
He played in 101 National Rugby League games for the Canterbury club, scoring 38 tries, including one in the 1998 NRL Grand Final defeat against the Brisbane Broncos.

St Helens
He signed for St. Helens in late 2003. He made his Super League début on 24 August 2003 against Hull F.C. Talau scored two tries in the 2004 Challenge Cup Final, and participated in St Helens' 2006 treble, scoring in both the 2006 Challenge Cup Final and the 2006 Super League Grand Final. Talau scored 11 tries in 29 games during the 2006 season. As 2006 Super League champions, St Helens faced 2006 NRL Premiers the Brisbane Broncos in the 2007 World Club Challenge. Talau played at centre in the Saints' 18–14 victory. He played in 2008's Super League XIII Grand Final defeat by the Leeds Rhinos.

Salford
Talau joined the Super League side the Salford City Reds for the start of the 2009 season. He retired from the sport at the end of the 2010 season.

International career

New Zealand
He played for the Junior Kiwis as a youth.

Talau played in 13 games for the New Zealand national rugby league team from 1999 to 2006,

Talau was selected for the New Zealand team to compete in the end of season 1999 Rugby League Tri-Nations tournament. In the final against Australia he played at centre in the Kiwis' 22–20 loss.

He was selected in the Kiwis squad for the 2000 World Cup, playing in the World Cup Final defeat to the Kangaroos at Old Trafford.

Samoa
In 2007 Talau switched allegiances to Samoa. The following year he represented Samoa in the 2008 Rugby League World Cup, playing two matches.

Legacy
In 2008 he was named in the Taranaki Rugby League Team of the Century.

References

External links
Willie Talau St Helens Career Page at the Saints Heritage Society.
Willie Talau Bulldogs Profile

1976 births
Living people
Canterbury-Bankstown Bulldogs players
Junior Kiwis players
New Zealand national rugby league team players
New Zealand rugby league players
People educated at Spotswood College
Rugby league centres
Salford Red Devils players
Samoa national rugby league team players
Samoan emigrants to New Zealand
Samoan rugby league players
Sportspeople from Apia
St Helens R.F.C. players
Taranaki rugby league team players